The 1941–42 Stanford Indians (now the Cardinal) men's basketball team won their first and only NCAA basketball championship in 1942. Stanford was also retroactively named the national champion by the Helms Athletic Foundation and the Premo-Porretta Power Poll.

NCAA basketball tournament
West
 Stanford 53, Rice 47
Final Four
 Stanford 46, Colorado 35
Stanford 53, Dartmouth 38

Awards and honors
 Howie Dallmar, NCAA Men's MOP Award

References

Stanford
Stanford Cardinal men's basketball seasons
NCAA Division I men's basketball tournament championship seasons
NCAA Division I men's basketball tournament Final Four seasons
Stanford
Stanford Card
Stanford Card